The 1991 English cricket season was the 92nd in which the County Championship had been an official competition. West Indies and England drew 2–2 in the main Test series. Sri Lanka also toured England and played one Test which England won. The Britannic Assurance County Championship was won by Essex.

Honours
County Championship – Essex
NatWest Trophy – Hampshire
Sunday League – Nottinghamshire
Benson & Hedges Cup – Worcestershire
Minor Counties Championship – Staffordshire
MCCA Knockout Trophy – Staffordshire
Second XI Championship – Yorkshire II 
Wisden – Curtly Ambrose, Phillip DeFreitas, Allan Donald, Richie Richardson, Waqar Younis

Test series

West Indies tour

Sri Lanka tour

County Championship

NatWest Trophy

Benson & Hedges Cup

Sunday League

Leading batsmen

Leading bowlers

References

External sources
 CricketArchive – season and tournament itineraries

Annual reviews
 Playfair Cricket Annual 1992
 Wisden Cricketers' Almanack 1992

English cricket seasons in the 20th century
English Cricket Season, 1991
Cricket season